This is a listing of the ministers who served in Limann's People's National Party government during the Third Republic of Ghana. The Third Republic was inaugurated on 24 September 1979. It ended with the coup on 31 December 1981, which brought the Provisional National Defence Council of Jerry Rawlings to power.

List of ministers

See also
People's National Party

References

Nkrumaism
History of Ghana
Politics of Ghana
Governments of Ghana
1979 in Ghana
1981 in Ghana
1979 establishments in Ghana
1981 disestablishments in Ghana